Sri Prakash Lohia (born 11 August 1952) is an Indian-born Indonesian billionaire businessman, and the founder and chairman of Indorama Corporation, a diversified petrochemical and textile company.

Lohia hails from India, but has spent the majority of his professional life in Indonesia since 1974.  In 2013, Forbes ranked him as the 6th richest person in Indonesia, with a net worth of US$3 billion.

Early life
Lohia was born in Kolkata on 11 August 1952 to Mohan Lal Lohia and Kanchan Devi Lohia. He has three brothersOm, Ajey (original name Ajay Prakash), and Aloke (original name Alok or Anil Prakash)and one sisterAruna.

Career
In 1973, Lohia moved to Indonesia with his father Mohan Lal Lohia and started Indorama Synthetics, which began to manufacture spun yarns in 1976.

The company was divided in the late 1980s by Mohan Lal Lohia between his three sons to avoid family disputes in the future. Lohia's elder brother Om Prakash moved to India and set up Indorama Synthetics. Aloke, Lohia's younger brother, went to Thailand to found Indorama Holdings, which is a wool yarn producer.

In 1991, Indorama Synthetics diversified into the manufacture of polyester fibers and then polyester bottle-grade (PET) resins in 1995.  
 
In 2006, Lohia acquired an integrated olefin plant in Nigeria, which is today the largest petrochemical company in West Africa and the second largest olefin producer in Africa.

Indorama Corporation is Lohia's principal holding company, which is based in Singapore.

Wealth 

In 2015, the Lohia family was one of the 50 wealthiest families in Asia.

Personal life
Lohia rarely gives interviews or makes public appearances.

Lohia and his wife, Seema Mittal (sister of Lakshmi Mittal), have two children, Amit and Shruti. Amit graduated magna cum laude from the University of Pennsylvania's Wharton School of Business.  He is the managing director of Indorama Corporation and a director in various Indorama companies.  Lohia's daughter, Shruti Hora, graduated from Babson College and currently resides in Singapore. Lohia is  brother-in-law of Lakshmi Mittal.

Lohia is one of the world's largest collectors of old books and lithographs. He has the world's second largest collection of colored lithographs. He is working to digitize all his lithographs and those at other leading libraries around the world.

Awards 
In 2012, Lohia was given the Pravasi Bharatiya Samman award (Overseas Indian award) by the President of India.

See also 
List of Indonesians by net worth

References

1952 births
Living people
Indian chief executives
Indian emigrants to Indonesia
Indonesian people of Indian descent
Businesspeople from Kolkata
Rajasthani people
Indian billionaires
Indonesian billionaires
Indonesian Hindus
Mittal family
Sri Prakash